Robin Hood and the Pedlars is Child ballad 137.

Synopsis
Robin Hood, Little John, and Will Scarlet meet up with three pedlars and urge them to stay; they go on. Robin shoots at one, striking through his pack to the skin, with force enough to kill him without the pack having been in the way. They throw down their packs and await Robin, but the first, Kit o Thirske, breaks Robin's bow. Robin insists that they give them time to get staves; then they fight, hard enough that all six regret it.  A blow from Kit knocks Robin down, unconscious.

Little John and Will call off the fight, saying Robin is dead.  Kit offers them a balsame to heal him. The pedlars go on to Nottingham, and Little John and Will tend Robin. As soon as he regains consciousness, he vomits the balsame, and all three of them are filthy.

External links
Robin Hood and the Pedlars

Child Ballads
Robin Hood ballads
Year of song unknown